Lillian Echelon Mbadiwe is a Nollywood actress, producer, model and a business woman who became popular in the Nollywood industry due to her movie Black rose.

Filmography 
Break The Silence
Breaking Chain
Black Rose
Lily’s New Friend
Living Nightmares
Seminarian In Love
Laurie
Love Unusual
The Debt
Flipside
Yahoo+

Nominations and award 
Nomination for the Best female actor at AMVCA ,2018.

Golden Discovery Actor at Gold Movie Award

Golden Actress for Drama at Gold Movie Award Africa.

See also 
Ivie Okujaye
Elma Mbadiwe
Black rose (2018 film)

References 

Living people
Year of birth missing (living people)
Nigerian film actresses
Nigerian film producers
Nigerian female models
Nigerian women film producers
Nigerian businesspeople
21st-century Nigerian actresses
Nigerian women in business